Suolahti may refer to:

Places

Suolahti, former town and municipality of Finland

People
Jaakko Suolahti (1918 – 1987), Finnish historian
Heikki Suolahti (1920 – 1936), Finnish composer
Hugo Suolahti (1874 - 1944), Finnish politician, linguist and philologist